Jardel Rodrigues Afonso Nazaré (born 16 May 1995) is a São Toméan footballer who plays as a left-back for Georgian Erovnuli Liga club FC Saburtalo Tbilisi and the São Tomé and Príncipe national team. He also holds Portuguese citizenship.

International career
Nazaré made his senior debut for São Tomé and Príncipe at the 2021 Africa Cup of Nations qualification on 13 November 2019, in a 0–4 loss to Sudan.

References

External links
 

1995 births
Living people
São Tomé and Príncipe footballers
People from São Tomé
São Tomé and Príncipe international footballers
A Lyga players
FC Stumbras players
FC Saburtalo Tbilisi players
São Tomé and Príncipe expatriate footballers
São Tomé and Príncipe expatriates in Lithuania
Expatriate footballers in Lithuania
Expatriate footballers in Georgia (country)
São Tomé and Príncipe emigrants to Portugal
Naturalised citizens of Portugal
Portuguese footballers
Black Portuguese sportspeople
Portuguese people of São Tomé and Príncipe descent
Campeonato de Portugal (league) players
Associação Naval 1º de Maio players
C.F. União players
A.R.C. Oleiros players
Portuguese expatriate footballers
Portuguese expatriate sportspeople in Lithuania
Association football defenders
Association football midfielders